Christopher Eugene Chalk (born December 7, 1977) is an American actor.

Early life
Born in Asheville, North Carolina, studied at Asheville High School and graduated in 1996 and went to the University of North Carolina at Greensboro.

Career
Chalk is known for television roles such as journalist Gary Cooper in The Newsroom, Marine Tom Walker in Homeland, and murderer Jody Adair in Justified. He has also been in multiple Law & Order episodes and appears in Gotham as a young Lucius Fox. He is also known for his roles in the 2010 Broadway play Fences, and the films 12 Years a Slave (2013) and The Red Sea Diving Resort (2019).

Personal life
In September 2016 Chalk got engaged to K.D. Chalk, whom he married in his hometown of Asheville on April 22 of the following year.

Filmography

References

External links

Living people
American male television actors
American male stage actors
American male film actors
People from Asheville, North Carolina
African-American male actors
University of North Carolina at Greensboro alumni
21st-century American male actors
Male actors from North Carolina
Theatre World Award winners
1986 births
21st-century African-American people
20th-century African-American people